Jefferson City (originally named Mossy Creek) is a city in Jefferson County, Tennessee, United States. It is part of the Morristown Metropolitan Statistical Area. As of the 2020 census the population was 8,419.

History
Heading southwest along the Holston River from Virginia, Adam and Elizabeth Peck arrived on the banks of Mossy Creek in 1788, soon settling the area with a fort, a house of worship, and a gristmill.
It is suggested that the original name of the city, Mossy Creek, originated due to the first settlers' description of the 'vivid' green moss developed around a creek near the settlement. By 1797, Mossy Creek had around 75 to 100 families with a four-mile-radius of the city.

Around the beginnings of the American Civil War in September 1861, Union Army General Ambrose Burnside liberated the city from the Confederacy, but was attacked in an unsuccessful siege by Confederate General James Longstreet. Several skirmishes took place around Mossy Creek, most notably the Battle of Mossy Creek on December 19, 1863.

In the later 19th century, two communities formed around Mossy Creek, Frame Addition and Carsonville. In 1901, Mossy Creek merged with the two communities, incorporating as Jefferson City.

In 1940, the Tennessee Valley Authority (TVA) began purchasing property in Jefferson City for the construction of Cherokee Dam and the impounding of the Holston River for Cherokee Lake. Many residents reluctantly gave up their farms and homes for the promise of flood control and electricity offered by the TVA. Construction brought many new residents to the city, and Cherokee Lake made Jefferson City a popular recreational hub for locals and tourists alike.

In the late 20th century, Jefferson City became industrialized with the zinc mining industry after geologists discovered valuable zinc ore deposits around the city earlier in the century.

Since 2010, redevelopment and revitalization efforts have been underway in the downtown district of Jefferson City. The Mossy Creek Foundation, a 501(c)(3) organization, was established in 2012 to advance these efforts, receiving funding a for a public park with a mock train depot pavilion on the original site of the Mossy Creek station, and facade grants for existing structures downtown.

Geography
Jefferson City is located in northern Jefferson County at  (36.116389, -83.486500). It is bordered to the west by New Market, to the south by Dandridge, and to the northeast by Morristown.

U.S. Route 11E, the Andrew Johnson Highway, passes through the south side of the city. It leads northeast  to the center of Morristown and west  to New Market. Tennessee State Route 92 passes through the west side of Jefferson City, leading north  to Rutledge and south  to the center of Dandridge.

The northwest boundary of the city touches the southernmost arm of Cherokee Lake, a reservoir on the Holston River.

Climate

Demographics

2020 census

As of the 2020 United States census, there were 8,419 people, 2,846 households, and 1,703 families residing in the city.

2000 census
As of the census of 2000, there were 7,760 people, 2,821 households, and 1,692 families residing in the city. The population density was 1,464.0 people per square mile (565.3/km2). There were 3,155 housing units at an average density of 595.2 per square mile (229.8/km2). The racial makeup of the city was 89.99% White, 6.29% African American, 0.44% Native American, 0.76% Asian, 0.17% Pacific Islander, 1.15% from other races, and 1.21% from two or more races. Hispanic or Latino of any race were 2.73% of the population.

There were 2,821 households, out of which 27.3% had children under the age of 18 living with them, 42.9% were married couples living together, 13.6% had a female householder with no husband present, and 40.0% were non-families. 31.1% of all households were made up of individuals, and 10.6% had someone living alone who was 65 years of age or older. The average household size was 2.29, and the average family size was 2.86.

In the city, the population was spread out, with 19.0% under the age of 18, 25.6% from 18 to 24, 24.1% from 25 to 44, 16.9% from 45 to 64, and 14.3% who were 65 years of age or older. The median age was 28 years. For every 100 females, there were 89.3 males. For every 100 females age 18 and over, there were 84.6 males.

The median income for a household in the city was $25,911, and the median income for a family was $33,964. Males had a median income of $28,306 versus $18,739 for females. The per capita income for the city was $13,770. About 19.7% of families and 24.7% of the population were below the poverty line, including 28.4% of those under age 18 and 14.4% of those age 65 or over.

Government

Municipal
Jefferson City uses the council-manager government system, which was established in 1901 when the city was incorporated. It is governed by a five-member city council composed of the mayor and four council members.

State
Jefferson City is represented in the Tennessee House of Representatives in the 17th and 11th districts by Representatives Andrew Farmer and Jeremy Faison respectively, both Republican.

In the Tennessee State Senate, Jefferson City is represented by the 8th district by Republican Frank Niceley.

Federal
Jefferson City is represented in the United States House of Representatives by Republican Tim Burchett of the 2nd congressional district.

Education

Public schools
Public schools in Jefferson City are operated by the Jefferson County Department of Education. Elementary students attend Jefferson Elementary, middle school students attend Jefferson Middle, and high school students attend Jefferson County High School in neighboring Dandridge along with other students in the Jefferson County Schools District.

Carson-Newman University
Carson-Newman University, a private Southern Baptist liberal arts university, is located in Jefferson City adjacent to its downtown district. It was founded in 1851, and has an estimated student enrollment of 2,500.

Notable people
 Dana X. Bible, college football coach at Texas A & M, Nebraska, and Texas
 Mark Dean, inventor and computer scientist
 Phil Garner, ex-Major League Baseball player and manager
 Jim Henry, minority leader in the Tennessee House of Representatives from 1981 to 1986
 Kenneth Massey, American statistician
 Robert Edward Lee Mountcastle, a member of the Republican National Committee
 Carolyn Peck, former women's basketball coach, currently a basketball analyst at ESPN
 Herbert S. Walters, U.S. senator
 Clyde Wright, ex-Major League Baseball pitcher

References

External links
 
  Jefferson County's Standard Banner newspaper

Cities in Tennessee
Cities in Jefferson County, Tennessee
Morristown metropolitan area, Tennessee
Mining communities in Tennessee